The St. Paul Let's Cure Lupus Cash Spiel is an annual bonspiel, or curling tournament, that takes place at the St. Paul Curling Club in St. Paul, Minnesota. It is part of the World Curling Tour. The bonspiel takes place during the 6th/7th week of the Tour. In the past, the event has been held using a triple knockout format, but a round-robin tournament format has been used since the 2010 spiel. The men's tournament was started in 1994 and has been held every year since 1998 as part of the World Curling Tour. The women's tournament is due to begin in 2011.

Past champions
''Only skip's name is displayed.

Men

Women

References

External links
Official Site of the St. Paul Cash Spiel

World Curling Tour events
Women's World Curling Tour events
Sports in Saint Paul, Minnesota
Curling in Minnesota
Ontario Curling Tour events
1994 establishments in Minnesota
Recurring sporting events established in 1994